Natesan Park is a park in T.Nagar, Chennai, India. It is located on Venkatanarayana Road. It is the only park maintained by the Chennai Corporation that has a separate tennis court for coaching children. There is also a plant propagation centre and play zone for children. It is a popular spot for morning walks for the local residents. Plant varieties found in the park include Croton, Aralia, Bougainvillea, Acalypha, Caesalpinia pulcherrima, mahogany, neem, gulmohar, Cassia fistula and foliage trees like pungam, palms, Ficus religiosa and Thespesia.

See also

 Parks in Chennai

References

Parks in Chennai
Tourist attractions in Chennai
Urban public parks
1950 establishments in Madras State